Phyllis Morris (18 July 1894 – 9 February 1982) was an English dramatist, children's writer and actress. As an interwar actor "she was uncommonly astute in a sequence of character parts".

Life
Phyllis Morris was born on 18 July 1894 in Walthamstow and educated at Cheltenham Ladies College. From 1947 to 1952, she worked as an actress in Hollywood, "playing there, as in Britain, any number of grim-featured harridans". She died on 9 February 1982 at Denville Hall, Northwood.

Publications

Children's books
 Dandelion Clocks. London: Erskine Macdonald, 1917
 Peter's Pencil. London, 1920
 The Adventures of Willy and Nilly. London & New York, 1921
 " Spook Town" unpublished Illustrated by Helen Morris,  her mother circa 1920

Plays
 The Rescue Party, 1926
 Made in Heaven, 1926
 Tinker, Tailor, 1928

Theatre performances
 Service by Dodie Smith, 1932
 Music in the Air, 1933
 The Laughing Woman by Gordon Daviot, 1934
 Mrs Nobby Clark
 Call It a Day by Dodie Smith, 1935
 Worm's Eye View by R. F. Delderfield, 1945

Filmography
 The Life of the Party, 1934
 Hyde Park, 1934
 The Adventures of Tartu, 1943
 That Forsyte Woman, 1949
 Mandy, 1952
 The Embezzler, (1954) - (Mrs. Paulson:- uncredited)

References

1894 births
1982 deaths
20th-century English actresses
English dramatists and playwrights
English children's writers
English women dramatists and playwrights